Healthcare in Jersey is provided by a range of publicly and privately owned providers. Health matters are overseen by the Department of Health and Community Services in the Government of Jersey. The current Health Minister is Deputy Richard Renouf.

Care at Jersey General Hospital  is provided free at the point of use to most ordinary residents of Jersey and emergency care is provided to anyone. However, other services such as GP consultations are privately owned and a fee applies to use them.

There is a Reciprocal Health Agreement with the United Kingdom, agreed in 2011.  It does not cover pre-existing or non-urgent conditions.

History 

Between 1945 and the Queen's coronation in 1952, there were outbreaks of polio and tuberculosis and the opening of the Jersey Maternity hospital and St John Ambulance headquarters. Agriculture was hit by a series of foot-and-mouth outbreaks.

Healthcare system 
Jersey operates a system of health cards. Anyone resident in the island for more than six months is eligible for a health card. Card holders are eligible for subsidised GP appointments and free prescriptions.

Emergency care is available in the Emergency Department of Jersey General Hospital for free for anyone who needs it.

Non-emergency care at the hospital is only available free to eligible persons. Pregnant women who are eligible can also get free maternity care and any baby born in Jersey, regardless of whether the parents are eligible, can get free postnatal care too. The following types of people - and their spouse, civil partner and dependent children - are eligible:

 Jersey residents with a health card who are in employment, who receive a pension or who have lived in the island for 12 months
 Licensed-status residents
 Permanently Entitled-status residents employed in Jersey
 Permanently Entitled-status residents who have paid tax and social security for 30 years and is in receipt of a pension.

Long-term care is provided for a charge under the Long-Term Care (Health and Community Services Charges) (Jersey) Law 2012, unless they are receiving care for specified mental health reasons. Adults can apply for financial assistance from the Customer and Local Services Department under the Long-Term Care Scheme. Minors who are ordinarily resident can get this care free of charge.

General Practitioners and Dentists are private organisations, so they charge fees for consultations.

Bandages and dressings are not provided.  Patients have to provide their own.  Family Nursing and Home Care, a local charity which administers free at-home care, cannot cover the cost of dressings.

Emergency care
See States of Jersey Ambulance Service

Proposed reform 
The Jersey Care Model (JCM) is the conceptual framework for organising the health system in Jersey. The model is based around a 'three-ring' model: Person-centred Care, Primary and Community Services and Specialist Services.

Currently, the Government argues, too much treatment is focused on the hospital. For example, the Emergency Department receives patient visits that are not emergency visits. However, under its reform programme, there will be better self-care and preventative care. The following changes are proposed –

 more preventative care
 community outpatient appointments
 long-term condition treatment through GP practices
 boost Island-wide care services through community and voluntary sector
 establish an Urgent Treatment Centre to take non-emergency care away from the Emergency Department
 more day surgery
 do more cancer treatment on-island

New hospital debate 
There is a large debate about the construction of a new hospital in Jersey. A States Assembly Proposition (P.82/2012) set out the need for a new hospital in 2012. This has been re-affirmed by the Jersey Care Model published in 2019.

On 13 February 2019, the States Assembly adopted a proposition (P.5/2019) that rescinded the approval of Gloucester Street (the current hospital site) as the site for the Future Hospital. The proposition also rejected the idea that the new hospital should be built at People's Park, Lower Park, Victoria Park, Westmount Gardens or the Parade Gardens. The States voted 39  and 7  the decision. The  voters included Health Minister Deputy Richard Renouf who had previously supported the site, claiming the Gloucester St location had been "straight-jacketed" by the Island Plan. The Chief Minister said it would be "madness" to vote for the Gloucester St site again. The proposition does not rule out the Gloucester Street site, but calls for the restart of the selection process. As a result, a 'significant portion' of the £41 million spent on the project today had to be written off, including the purchasing of a number of buildings on Kensington Place.

In July 2020, the Our Hospital Team published the site shortlist for the new hospital, including five sites: St Andrew's Park; People's Park; Overdale; Five Oaks; and Millbrook Playing Fields. 82 sites had originally been considered by the report team. Notably, St Saviour's Hospital and Warwick Farm were rejected due to being at an "unsustainable" location.

On 17 November 2020, it was approved by the States Assembly that the new hospital would be constructed at Overdale in St Helier. It is expected to cost at least £550 million, but could cost up to £800 million.

The legal device launches a vote at a St Helier parish assembly which means the purchase of parish land could be blocked until more information is provided.

On 1 February 2021, the States Assembly approved Westmount Road as the new access route for the hospital. The States voted 34  and 11  the decision. A number of protestors tied ribbons to trees that the protestors claimed would be destroyed by the project. The Government denied that any of them will be affected. Senator Lyndon Farnham, who is the minister responsible for the project, clarified the cost of the proposed road would be £15.1 million.

On 3 February 2022, the Our Hospital plans to demolish the existing buildings at Overdale were rejected, though this is not expected to have an impact on the delivery of the new hospital. Furthermore, on 2 March 2022, the Planning Department objected to the proposed development because of the quality of design, the height of the building and the impact on the green backdrop zone. On 16 March 2022, the Government accepted that if the hospital planning application is not approved, then a dual-site option could be used instead.

In May 2022 the Minister of the Environment gave planning permission for the new hospital which will be built by a joint venture partnership between ROK and FCC Construcción known as ROK FCC JV at a cost of £804 million.

See also 

 Health in Jersey
List of hospitals in Jersey

References 

Healthcare in Jersey
Health in Jersey
Jersey